Colonel Evan Henry Llewellyn (25 February 1847 – 27 February 1914) was a British Army officer and a Conservative  politician who sat in the House of Commons between 1885 and 1906.

Llewellyn was the fourth son of Llewellyn Llewellyn of Buckland Filleigh, North Devon. He was educated at Rugby School. He was a J.P. and Deputy Lieutenant of Somerset. He served in the British Army, where he was an officer in the 4th (Militia) battalion of the Somersetshire Light Infantry. He was later the commander of the 2nd (Central African) Battalion, King's African Rifles.

In the 1885 general election, Llewellyn was elected as Member of Parliament (MP) for North Somerset and held the seat until the 1892 general election. He was re-elected for the seat in the 1895 general election and held it until the 1906 general election.

Llewellyn lived at Langford Court, Somerset. His son Hoel also served with distinction in the Second Boer War. He is the great-great-grandfather of David Cameron, who was Prime Minister of the United Kingdom from 2010 to 2016.

References

External links
National Portrait Gallery

1847 births
1914 deaths
People educated at Rugby School
Conservative Party (UK) MPs for English constituencies
Deputy Lieutenants of Somerset
UK MPs 1885–1886
UK MPs 1886–1892
UK MPs 1895–1900
UK MPs 1900–1906
Directors of the Great Western Railway
King's African Rifles officers